Heysam Hashemizadeh (born 20 February 1997 in Ahvaz, Iran) is an Iranian footballer who plays as a forward for Iranian club Naft Masjed Soleyman in the Persian Gulf Pro League.

Honours

Club
Esteghlal Khuzestan
Persian Gulf Pro League (1) : 2015–16

References

1997 births
Living people
Iranian footballers
Foolad FC players
Naft Masjed Soleyman F.C. players
Esteghlal Khuzestan players
Association football forwards
People from Ahvaz
Sportspeople from Khuzestan province